Tetraroginae is a subfamily of marine ray-finned fishes, commonly known as waspfishes or sailback scorpionfishes, belonging to the family Scorpaenidae, the scorpionfishes and their relatives. These fishes are native to the Indian Ocean and the West Pacific. As their name suggests, waspfishes are often venomous; having poison glands on their spines. These creatures usually live in hiding places on the sea bottom.

Taxonomy and etymology
Tetraroginae, or Tetrarogidae, was first formally recognised as a taxonomic grouping in 1949 by the South African ichthyologist J.L.B. Smith. The 5th edition of Fishes of the World treats this as a subfamily of the scorpionfish family Scorpaenidae, however other authorities treat it as a valid family, the Tetrarogidae. A recent study placed the waspfishes into an expanded stonefish clade, within the family Synanceiidae, because all of these fish have a lachrymal sabre that can project a switch-blade-like mechanism out from underneath their eye.

The name of the subfamily is based on the genus name Tetraroge, which was described in 1860 by Albert Günther and its name means "four clefts", an allusion to the four clfts in the gills  in comparison to the five clefts in the gills of Pentaroge, now regarded as a synonym of Gymnapistes.

Genera
The following genera are classified within the subfamily Tetraroginae:
 Genus Ablabys Kaup, 1873
 Genus Centropogon Gunther, 1860
 Genus Coccotropsis Barnard, 1927
 Genus Cottapistus Bleeker, 1876
 Genus Glyptauchen Gunther, 1860
 Genus Gymnapistes Swainson, 1839
 Genus Liocranium Ogilby, 1903
 Genus Neocentropogon Matsubara, 1943
 Genus Neovespicula Mandrytsa, 2001
 Genus Notesthes Ogilby, 1903
 Genus Ocosia Jordan & Starks, 1904
 Genus Paracentropogon Bleeker, 1876
 Genus Pseudovespicula Mandrytsa, 2001
 Genus Richardsonichthys J.L.B. Smith, 1958
 Genus Snyderina Jordan & Starks, 1901
 Genus Tetraroge Gunther, 1860
 Genus Vespicula Jordan & Richardson, 1910

The genus Vespicula is not universally recognised, its type species is Apistus trachinoides, which some workers have placed in the monotypic genus Trichosomus Swainson, 1839 with the two remaining species being classified within the genus Pseudovespicula.

Characteristics
Tetraroginae waspfishes have compressed bodies with heads typically with ridges and spines. The spines on the operculum are divergent and the gill membrane is free from isthmus. There is a large mobile spine below each eye which may be projected outwards. The venom borne on the spines of these fishes is very potent.

Distribution and habitat
Tetraroginae waspfishes are almost all found in the Indian and western Pacific Ocean, the exception is the smoothskin scorpionfish (Coccotropsis gymnoderma) found in the southeastern Atlantic off South Africa. They are demersal fishes, mostly marine, but some species will live in brackish water with one, the bullrout (Notesthes robusta) spending mucjh of its life in the freshwater reaches of rivers.

Biology
Tetraroginae waspfishes are extremely venomous and the wounds inflicted by the spines can be extremely painful and may even be dangerous. They are predatory fishes, which feed on crustaceans and fishes.

References

 
Scorpaenidae
Marine fish families
Taxa named by J. L. B. Smith